"Save Your Kisses for Me" was the winning song of the Eurovision Song Contest 1976, performed for the  by Brotherhood of Man in The Hague, Netherlands. The lyrics and music were written by Tony Hiller, Lee Sheriden, and Martin Lee, the latter two being members of the band. The song became a worldwide hit, reaching No. 1 in many countries, including the UK, where it became the biggest-selling song of the year. Overall, it remains one of the biggest-selling Eurovision winners ever, and the biggest such seller in the UK.

Background and production 
"Save Your Kisses for Me" was originally written by member Lee Sheriden in August 1974. On bringing the song in to the next songwriting session, others thought that the title was clumsy and reworked it into "Oceans of Love". Sheriden was unhappy with the changes and the song was shelved. A year later when it came to coming up with songs for the next album, they discovered that they needed one more song and Sheriden again put forth "Save Your Kisses for Me". This time it was accepted, as he later recalled:"I'd had a year to think about it, I knew exactly what I wanted to do on the arrangement, the glockenspiel on the beginning and the big 12-string acoustic guitar and the strings, and then came the day to record the song... It was about midnight and I sang it and it went well. I could see everyone behind the glass panel getting excited and I thought great, they all really like the song, and as I finished I was waiting for them to press the button so they could speak to me and say 'great, we've got a hit' or whatever, and the person pressing it said: 'Lee, we think Martin should sing this song'. But I didn't mind because Martin came in and sung it to perfection."

Soon after, manager Tony Hiller was keen for the group to try for Eurovision, now that the qualifying rounds had changed in the UK. Up till that time, a singer was nominated to perform, but for 1976 it was opened up to different singers to enter their own songs. Brotherhood of Man put forward "Save Your Kisses for Me" and it was accepted as one of the 12 finalists. It won A Song for Europe on 25 February 1976, beating second-placed Co-Co by just two points. The song was released as a single and reached number one in the UK Singles Chart, two weeks before the Eurovision finals were held on 3 April.

Eurovision victory 
The song was performed first on the night, preceding 's Peter, Sue and Marc with "Djambo, Djambo". The performance consisted of the two male singers wearing black and white suits, and the two females wearing white and red jumpsuits with matching berets, standing still and singing with minor arm and leg choreography. The song's lyrics described the gently conflicted emotions of a man leaving his loved one in the morning as he goes to work. The song's final line provided a twist that the person in question was his three-year-old child.

It was awarded the maximum twelve points by seven countries, totalling 164 points compared to the second-placed French entry with 147 points, and was the second consecutive Eurovision winner that was performed first in the order of presentation. According to John Kennedy O'Connor's The Eurovision Song Contest – The Official History, the song is the biggest selling single for a winning entry in the history of the contest. It also still holds the record for the highest relative score under the voting system introduced in 1975 (which has been used in every contest since), with an average of 9.65 points per jury  After winning the contest, the song reached No.1 in many countries across Europe and eventually sold more than six million copies. In the UK, it stayed at No. 1 for six weeks and was certified platinum by the BPI in May 1976, becoming the biggest selling single of the year. The song also hit number one in a number of other countries, such as France where it remained in the peak position for five weeks. In the United States, the song was a moderate pop hit (No. 27 on the Billboard Hot 100) but went all the way to No. 1 on the Easy Listening chart; it would be the only hit the band (in its post-1973 incarnation) would have in the US.

At the same time as the single was at No.1, the group released their latest album; Love and Kisses, which featured "Save Your Kisses for Me". The group followed this up with the similarly themed "My Sweet Rosalie", which was also a hit around Europe. The group continued to score hits in the UK, with two more chart toppers in the next two years; however, this was not the case in the United States, where "Save Your Kisses for Me" was the group's final chart entry (and only one under this lineup).

"Save Your Kisses for Me" is still one of the best-selling singles of all time in the UK, with sales of over a million copies. It also won four ASCAP awards in 1977.

Track listing
 "Save Your Kisses for Me" (Tony Hiller / Lee Sheriden / Martin Lee) 3:06
 "Let's Love Together" (Hiller / Sheriden / Lee / Sandra Stevens) 2:57

Chart performance

Weekly charts
Brotherhood of Man

Bobby Vinton

Year-end charts

Cover versions 
Among many cover versions, country singer Margo Smith had a major hit on the Country charts in 1976, while Bobby Vinton had a Billboard top 100 hit in the same year with his version. Brotherhood of Man themselves have re-recorded the song twice as well as releasing a Spanish version ("Tus Besos Son Para Mi") as a single in 1991.

The song was chosen in an internet poll conducted by the European Broadcasting Union in 2005 as one of the fourteen most popular songs in the history of the Eurovision, and was one of the entrants in the Congratulations fiftieth anniversary concert in Copenhagen, Denmark, held in October 2005. It was re-enacted by the group (who are still together) along with twelve dancers dressed in matching red, white, and black costumes with briefcases and a live orchestra as the original footage was shown in the background. It came fifth in the final voting.

Helena Vondráčková and Jíři Korn made a Czech version Já půjdu tam a ty tam, Rex Gildo a German (Küsse von dir).

Philipp Kirkorov recorded Russian version as Мимо опять.

In 2019, the Israeli singer of Ethiopian origin Eden Alene released it as her initial single. She was due to represent Israel in the Eurovision Song Contest 2020, however she did it in 2021 instead.

Icelandic musician Daði Freyr, who was also meant to compete in the Eurovision Song Contest 2020 and did so instead in 2021, included it in his second edition of JúróDaði, a video in which he covers past Eurovision songs.

Margo Smith version 

"Save Your Kisses for Me" was notably covered by Margo Smith in 1976. Her version of the song was recorded in a country format and released as a single via Warner Bros. Records.

Smith cut "Save Your Kisses for Me" in her second studio session for Warner Bros. Records. The session took place at the Columbia Recording Studio, located in Nashville, Tennessee, United States. The session was produced by Norro Wilson. An additional session in March would yield songs that would later make up her second studio album Songbird. Smith's cover version of the song was generally met with positive reception. Kurt Wolff of Country Music: The Rough Guide would later call the song one of the "sizeable hits" Smith would enjoy on the radio between 1976 and 1978. Robert K. Oermann and Mary A. Bufwack of Finding Her Voice: Women in Country Music stated the song represented Smith's "wholesome, homey image". This can be seen in Smith's other hits including "Take My Breath Away", "Don't Break the Heart That Loves You", and "It Only Hurts for a Little While". Two year after the song's release, Smith would identify more as a sexually-charged performer.

"Save Your Kisses for Me" was released as a single in May 1976 via Warner Bros. Records. It was Smith's first single issued by the label, after previously recording for Sugar Hill and 20th Century Fox. The song reached the tenth position on the Billboard Hot Country Singles chart in the fall of 1976. The single became Smith's second top-ten single on the country chart and would start a series of major hits for her. In July 1976, the single was released on Smith's first studio album for Warner Bros. Records entitled Song Bird. Margo Smith's version of the song is the most successful cover of "Save Your Kisses for Me" to date.

Track listing 
"Save Your Kisses for Me" – 3:04
"I'm About to Do It Again" – 2:32

Chart performance 
Weekly charts

Year-end chart

See also
1976 in country music
List of European number-one hits of 1976
List of Dutch Top 40 number-one singles of 1976
List of number-one hits of 1976 (France)
List of number-one singles of 1976 (Ireland)
List of number-one hits in Norway
List of number-one singles from the 1970s (UK)
List of number-one adult contemporary singles of 1976 (U.S.)

References

Songs about parenthood
Songs about kissing
1976 singles
Brotherhood of Man songs
Bobby Vinton songs
Margo Smith songs
Congratulations Eurovision songs
Eurovision songs of 1976
Eurovision songs of the United Kingdom
Eurovision Song Contest winning songs
European Hot 100 Singles number-one singles
Number-one singles in Belgium
Number-one singles in Norway
Dutch Top 40 number-one singles
Irish Singles Chart number-one singles
UK Singles Chart number-one singles
Songs written by Tony Hiller
Songs written by Lee Sheriden
Songs written by Martin Lee (singer)
Song recordings produced by Norro Wilson
Pye Records singles
Warner Records singles
1976 songs
Schlager songs